Kennedia procurrens, commonly known as the purple running pea, is a species of flowering plant in the family Fabaceae and is endemic to eastern Australia. It is a prostrate or climbing herb with trifoliate leaves and pale red to mauve or violet flowers.

Description

Taxonomy
Kennedia procurrens was first formally described in 1848 in Thomas Mitchell's Journal of an Expedition into the Interior of Tropical Australia. The specific epithet (procurrens) means "extending", "jutting out" or "projecting".

Distribution and habitat
Purple running pea grows in woodland in sandy soil in southern Queensland and northern New South Wales as far south as Coonabarabran.

References

procurrens
Fabales of Australia
Flora of New South Wales
Plants described in 1848
Taxa named by George Bentham